Class 321 may refer to:

British Rail Class 321, British rail unit
FS Class E.321, Italian shunting locomotive
Renfe Class 321